Acacia donaldsonii is a shrub of the genus Acacia and the subgenus Plurinerves that is endemism in an area of south western Australia.

Description
Like most species of Acacia it has phyllodes rather than true leaves. The pungent and rigid phyllodes have four to eight distant and obscure main nerves. The seed pods that form after flowering resemble a string of beads and are linear and curved and split open as they dry and become more twisted.

Taxonomy
The species was first formally described by the botanists Richard Sumner Cowan and Bruce Maslin in 1999 as part of the work Acacia miscellany 18. The taxonomy of miscellaneous species with sharply pungent phyllodes in Acacia section Plurinerve as published in the journal Nuytsia. It was reclassified as Racosperma donaldsonii in 2003 by Leslie Pedley then transferred back to gnus Acacia in 2006.

Distribution
It is native to an area in the Goldfields-Esperance region of Western Australia where it commonly situated on saline stony plains, near salt lakes and sandplains growing in clay, clay-loam, gravelly and sandy soils. It has a scattered distribution and is found from around Windimurra and Weebo Station and Lake Yindarlgooda in the north down to around Norseman in the south as well as Carlisle Lakes as a part of low open shrubland with various species of Atriplex and Maireana.

See also
 List of Acacia species

References

donaldsonii
Acacias of Western Australia
Taxa named by Bruce Maslin
Plants described in 1999
Taxa named by Richard Sumner Cowan